Emily Hsiu-Ching Chang (born August 11, 1980) is an American journalist, executive producer, and author. Chang was the anchor and executive producer of Bloomberg Technology, a daily TV show focused on global technology, and Studio 1.0, where she regularly speaks to top executives, investors, and entrepreneurs. Chang is the author of Brotopia: Breaking Up the Boys' Club of Silicon Valley, which alleges sexism and gender inequality in the tech industry.

Early life and education
Chang was born as Emily Hsiu-Ching Chang in Kailua, Honolulu County, Hawaii. Chang's mother is Sandra Galeone Chang. Chang's father was Laban Lee Bun Chang (died 2003), a lawyer and originally from Kaohsiung, Taiwan. Chang has a sister Sara. Chang grew up in Kailua, Hawaii and graduated from the Punahou School in 1998.

In 2002, Chang graduated with an A.B. (magna cum laude) in social studies at Harvard University.

Career 
Prior to joining CNN in 2007, Chang served as a reporter at KNSD, NBC's affiliate in San Diego, California. There, she filed reports for MSNBC and won five regional Emmy Awards. She started her career as a news producer at NBC in New York.

From 2007 to 2010, Chang served as an international correspondent for CNN, based in Beijing and London.

In Beijing, she reported on a wide range of stories, including the 2008 Beijing Olympics, China's economic transformation and its environmental consequences, the 2008 South China floods, the aftermath of the 2008 Sichuan earthquake, North Korea's nuclear ambitions and President Obama's historic visit to Asia. During Obama's visit to Shanghai, Chang was briefly detained by the police for her coverage of the banned Oba-mao T-shirt, which depicted the American President dressed in iconic Red Army attire.

In London, she covered international news for CNN's American Morning. There, she covered European and international events including the disappearance of Madeleine McCann. She had a one-on-one interview with Benazir Bhutto, former prime minister of Pakistan, weeks before her assassination.

Bloomberg Technology
In 2010, Chang joined Bloomberg Television. On February 28, 2011, Chang became the anchor of Bloomberg West as the only network or cable TV show to be based in San Francisco, California. The daily show features original reporting and interviews with tech newsmakers including venture capitalists, CEOs, start-up entrepreneurs, and analysts. In October 2016, the show was renamed Bloomberg Technology. Chang has interviewed top tech executives, investors and entrepreneurs, including Apple CEO Tim Cook, Facebook CEO Mark Zuckerberg, Facebook Chief Operating Officer Sheryl Sandberg, former Google Executive Chairman Eric Schmidt, Twitter Co-Founder Jack Dorsey, former Disney CEO Bob Iger, former Yahoo! CEO Marissa Mayer, and Alibaba Founder and Executive Chairman Jack Ma. Chang left Bloomberg Technology on November 10th, 2022 after 12 years anchoring the show.

Studio 1.0
Chang is also the host of Bloomberg Television's interview series, Studio 1.0, where she has interviewed Andreessen Horowitz co-founder Marc Andreessen, Microsoft CEO Satya Nadella, YouTube CEO Susan Wojcicki, Melinda Gates of the Gates Foundation, former HP and eBay CEO Meg Whitman, author Malcolm Gladwell, screenwriter Aaron Sorkin, DreamWorks founder Jeffrey Katzenberg, and Megaupload founder Kim Dotcom while he was under house arrest at his New Zealand mansion, among others.

Brotopia: Breaking Up the Boys' Club of Silicon Valley

Chang is the author of Brotopia: Breaking Up the Boys' Club of Silicon Valley, published in February 2018 by Portfolio Books, a division of Penguin Random House. The book investigates alleged sexism and gender inequality in Silicon Valley. It was an instant national bestseller and received significant media attention and critical acclaim.

Vanity Fair magazine ran an excerpt from the book in their January 2018 issue titled "Oh My God, This Is So F---ed Up": Inside Silicon Valley's Secretive, Orgiastic Dark Side." Bloomberg Businessweek ran an excerpt titled "Women Once Ruled the Computer World; When Did Silicon Valley Become Brotopia?"

The PBS "Newshour"-New York Times book club selected Brotopia as their April 2019 book club read.

HBO's Silicon Valley
Chang appeared as herself in the HBO show Silicon Valley, in which she interviewed various characters. She appeared in six episodes across three seasons.

Awards and recognitions 
 Emmy Awards
 2014 Business Insider The 100 Most Influential Tech People on Twitter - Ranked #91.
 2018 Rational360 Influencer Index - Top 50 journalists followed by CEOs on Twitter - Ranked #6.
 2018 Salesforce Equality Award - for work associated to addressing gender inequality in Silicon Valley.
 2019 11th Shorty Awards - Best Journalist (finalist).

While reporting for KNSD in San Diego, Chang won five Emmy Awards for her coverage of topics including drug smuggling across the US-Mexico border.

Filmography

Television series 
 Silicon Valley - Playing herself.
 2018 Morning Joe - As a guest.

Personal life
In 2010, Chang married Jonathan DeWees Stull in Haleiwa, Hawaii. They have four children.

References 

1980 births
Living people
American expatriates in China
American expatriates in England
American writers of Taiwanese descent
American journalists of Chinese descent
American television reporters and correspondents
News & Documentary Emmy Award winners
Punahou School alumni
Harvard College alumni
People from Honolulu County, Hawaii
American women television journalists
Bloomberg L.P. people
CNN people
Hawaii people of Chinese descent
American women journalists of Asian descent
21st-century American women